The Abbot of Fearn was the head of the Premonstratensian monastic community of Fearn Abbey, Easter Ross, Scotland. The Abbey was founded by canons from Whithorn Priory in Galloway, with the patronage of Fearchar mac an t-Sagairt, mormaer/earl of Ross. The foundation took place in the 1220s, according to the two distinct foundation dates given in the sources, either in 1221 or in 1227. Until about 1238, the Abbey was located at Fearn ("next to Kincaard in Stracharrin"), near Edderton, but it was moved to the Tarbat parish in that year and known thereafter as "nova Furnia".  Despite the fact that the head of Whithorn Priory was a prior and Fearn an abbot, Fearn seems to have remained subordinate to Whithorn until at least the end of the 14th century, and even in 1440 Abbot Fionnlagh II was confirmed by the prior of Whithorn.The reason for this is that Whithorn was a cathedral priory; the nominal head of its community was the bishop, but its actual head was the prior, as was the common use in England at places like Durham and Carlisle, but this was not usual in Scotland. In these circumstances the cathedral prior had the same rights as an ordinary abbot.

Little is known about the history of the abbots, and not all seem to be known by name. Fearn served for several centuries as a small but productive abbey, and served as the burial site for the Earls of Ross.  Monastic life began to decline after the Bishop of Caithness, a Church official named John Sinclair, put Fearn in Commendam by use of a falsified ecclesiastical document in 1490 and removed Fearn's abbot, Thomas MacCulloch, O. Praem.  Several commendatory (and non-ecclesiastical) abbots ruled Fearn for several decades, but only for its financial benefits.  Ross-shire went officially Presbyterian in 1560, and monastic life vanished completely.  The Abbey property was taken over by the bishopric of Ross in 1609. The following is a list of abbots and commendators:

List of abbots

 Maol Choluim (I) of Whithorn, 1220s or 1230s
 Maol Choluim (II) of Nigg, x 1251
 Macbeathad ("Machabeus") "Makhersin", 1251 x 1274
 Colin, 1255 x 1271
 Martein (Martin), 1299x1311
 John, 1299x1321
 Mark Ross, 1321 -1338
 Domhnall ("Donaldus") Pupill, 1345x1371 -1373
 Adam Monilaw, 1380 -1407
 Thomas Kiethirnathie, 1407x
 Fionnlagh (I) (or Finlay), 1436
 Fionnlagh (II) (Finlay McFaed), 1439-1483 x 1486
 Thomas MacCulloch, 1486-1490
 Nicholas Slugy, fl. 1491

List of commendators
 Andrew Stewart, 1508-1517
 Patrick Hamilton, 1517-1526
 Donald Denoon, 1525-1541
 Robert Cairncross, 1541-1545
 David Paniter, 1545
 James Cairncross, 1545-1550
 Nicholas Ross, 1550-1569
 Thomas Ross, 1566-1596
 Walter Ross of Morangie, 15 84
 Patrick Gordon of Letterfourie, 1591
 Patrick Murray of Geanies, 1598

Notes

Bibliography
 History of Fearn Abbey, published by Church of Scotland Fearn Abbey (available in church)
 Cowan, Ian B. & Easson, David E., Medieval Religious Houses: Scotland With an Appendix on the Houses in the Isle of Man, Second Edition, (London, 1976), pp. 101–02
 Watt, D. E. R. & Shead, N. F. (eds.), The Heads of Religious Houses in Scotland from the 12th to the 16th Centuries, The Scottish Records Society, New Series, Volume 24, (Edinburgh, 2001), p. 80-3

See also
 Fearn Abbey

Premonstratensians
Scottish abbots
Lists of abbots